Spencer's goanna (Varanus spenceri), also known commonly as Spencer's monitor, is a species of monitor lizard in the family Varanidae. The species is endemic to Australia.

Etymology
The specific name, spenceri, is in honor of English-Australian biologist Walter Baldwin Spencer.

Geographic range
Varanus spenceri is found in eastern Northern Territory and northwestern Queensland, Australia.

It is native to the Barkly Tableland.

Description
Spencer's monitor is generally heavier than a similarly sized monitor of another species due to its "stockier" build. It has sharp claws which it uses for digging burrows.

Diet
Varanus spenceri eats anything it can find, including highly venomous snakes, small mammals, small lizards, eggs, and carrion (dead animals), and is able to digest anything it eats.

Defensive behavior
When threatened, V. spenceri hisses loudly, distends its throat and whips its aggressor with its muscular tail.

Habitat
The preferred natural habitat of V. spenceri is grassland.

Living in black soil plains with no trees, Spencer's goanna is the only Australian monitor that does not readily climb, although juvenile animals will climb given the opportunity.

Reproduction
Clutch size of Spencer's monitor generally ranges between 11 and 30 eggs.

Taxonomy
Varanus ingrami , is an invalid name (a junior synonym) for this species.

References

Further reading
Cogger HG (2014). Reptiles and Amphibians of Australia, Seventh Edition. Clayton, Victoria, Australia: CSIRO Publishing. xxx + 1,033 pp. .
Lucas AHS, Frost C (1903). "Descriptions of two new Australian Lizards, Varanus spencer and Diplodactylus bilineatus ". Proceedins of the Royal Society of Victoria 15: 145–147. (Varanus spenceri, new species, pp. 145–146).
Mertens R (1958). "Bemerkungen über die Warane Australiens ". Senckenbergiana biologica 39: 229–264. (in German).
Wilson, Steve; Swan, Gerry (2013). A Complete Guide to Reptiles of Australia, Fourth Edition. Sydney: New Holland Publishers. 522 pp. .

External links
Photos at Kingsnake.com

Varanus
Reptiles of Queensland
Reptiles described in 1903
Reptiles of the Northern Territory
Monitor lizards of Australia
Taxa named by Arthur Henry Shakespeare Lucas
Taxa named by Charles Frost (naturalist)